Milan Radoičić (born 21 February 1978) is a Serbian businessman and politician. He is the vice president of the Serb List, an ethnic Serb minority political party in Kosovo.

Business career 
Radoičić was born in 1978 in Gjakova which at the time was a part of the Socialist Federal Republic of Yugoslavia.

In the last ten years, he and his team and godfather Zvonko Veselinović have developed businesses throughout Serbia, Kosovo and Montenegro, mainly in the field of trade and transport.

His name first appeared in the media in 2013, when, together with Zvonko Veselinović, he was accused of aiding and abetting abuse, while Goran Makragić and Ivan Stamenović were charged in the same public lawsuit for abuse of public position, Večernje novosti reported at the time. The indictment alleges that four defendants dug gravel on the Dimitrovgrad-Pirot section, which is part of Corridor 10, "without proper consent of the Ministry of Mining and Natural Resources, and without paying compensation to local authorities, and delivered it to builders on the route of the new road."

According to the Balkan Investigative Reporting Network (BIRN), Radoičić, together with his godfather, as he calls him in his statements, Zvonko Veselinović, was accused in 2012 of persuading Dragan Đuričić, who was the responsible person of the Euro cop company to keep 32 trucks after the lease expired and hand them over to them. Both were acquitted in 2015, while Đuričić was sentenced to three and a half years in prison. The main reason why Radoicic was released is that he was in custody from September 2009 to February 2011, but the verdict does not state what he was accused of.

He is a representative of FK Trepča.

In 2019 Veselinović and Radoičić were acquitted of charges of illegal gravel excavation.

Political career 
He is the vice president of the Serb List, an ethnic Serb minority political party in Kosovo.

In the summer of 2017, Radoičić and Goran Rakić, the president of the Serb List met with Behgjet Pacolli, a former Minister of Foreign Affairs of Kosovo in Budva to discuss the possibility of the Serb List joining the government of Kosovo and supporting Ramush Haradinaj who is wanted by Serbia for alleged war crimes, as the ex-prime minister.

On 12 September 2017, the President of Serbia, Aleksandar Vučić, mentioned Radoičić as one of the "guardians of Serbia in Kosovo and Metohija".

Oliver Ivanović murder 
In a posthumous interview with BIRN, Oliver Ivanović, leader of the Freedom of Democracy and Justice Civic Initiative, described Radoičić as one of the main centers of power in North Kosovo and expressed concern that President Vučić mentioned him as a "guardian of Serbia". Ivanović was assassinated a few months later.

Radoičić and Goran Rakić participated in the meeting with President Vučić and Kosovo Serbs in Belgrade on 22 November 2018. A day later, the Kosovan police special unit ROSU arrested four people in the North Kosovo on 23 November in connection with the murder of Ivanović. Prime Minister of Kosovo, Ramush Haradinaj confirmed that Radoičić was one of the people suspected of the assassination of Ivanović. Radoičić said that he does not plan to give up because Kosovan police wants to murder him.

On 26 November 2018, President Vučić told RTS that Radoičić certainly did not kill Ivanović and that he "did not participate in the organization, logistics, incitement" to murder. He added that Radoicic "was always the first to defend North Mitrovica". In July 2019, Kosovo prosecutor Sulj Hoxha stated that an international arrest warrant had been issued for Radoicic and pointed out that he was suspected of helping and organizing the group for the murder of Oliver Ivanovic, but also of being suspected of organized crime and drug trafficking.

U.S. sanctions 
On 8 December 2021, the U.S. Department of the Treasury added Radoičić to its Specially Designated Nationals (SDN) list. Individuals on the list have their assets blocked and U.S. persons are generally prohibited from dealing with them.

Notes and references

1978 births
Living people
Politicians from Gjakova
Kosovo Serbs
Specially Designated Nationals and Blocked Persons List